The International Emmy Award for Best Documentary is presented since 1967 by the International Academy of Television Arts & Sciences (IATAS) to the best documentaries produced and aired initially outside the United States.

Rules 
According to the rules of the International Academy, documentary is a factual presentation providing an in-depth analysis of a specific subject or point of view supported by evidence and informed commentary, on any subject other than art and artists. The program should fit the minimum format length of a televised half-hour time slot.

If the program is part of a continuous series of self-contained episodes (i.e. each episode has its own storyline with a conclusion; or each episode may have a different director and/or producer; or series has the potential to go on for multiple seasons), then each episode must be submitted as a separate entry. If the program is a multi-part series with a finite number of episodes (no further episodes planned), covering the same theme, two (2) episodes must be submitted to represent of the series as a whole.

If the program contains multiple parts with a continuing storyline beyond one episode, or share the same concept, two (2) episodes must be submitted to represent the series as a whole. The program may employ partial re-enactment, stock footage, stills, animation, stop-motion or other techniques, as long as the emphasis is on fact and not on fiction

Winnes and nominees

1960s-1970s

1980s

1990s

2000s

2010s

2020s

Breakdown
United Kingdom has the most awards for this category with 23 (including wins for both BBC and Channel 4).

References

External links
 Official website

Documentary
American documentary film awards
Awards established in 1967